The 1986 Derby City Council election took place on 8 May 1986 to elect members of Derby City Council in England. Local elections were held in the United Kingdom in 1986. This was on the same day as other local elections. 15 of the council's 44 seats were up for election. The Labour Party retained control of the council.

Overall results

|-
| colspan=2 style="text-align: right; margin-right: 1em" | Total
| style="text-align: right;" | 15
| colspan=5 |
| style="text-align: right;" | 49,741
| style="text-align: right;" |

Ward results

Abbey

Allestree

Alvaston

Babington

Blagreaves

Boulton

Breadsall

Darley

Littleover

Mackworth

Mickleover

Normanton

Osmanton

Sinfin

Spondon

References

1986 English local elections
May 1986 events in the United Kingdom
1986
1970s in Derbyshire